The SEAT 20V20 is an SUV concept car presented by the Spanish manufacturer SEAT at the March 2015 Geneva Salon International de l’Auto.

Design elements from this concept were later used in the SEAT Tarraco, which went into production in October 2018. The exterior design of the prototype had an orange five-door bodywork and large dimensions, its length being  and its boot having more than  capacity. 
The interior was customized to the extent of any concept car – a combination of grey, brown and white colours in both plastics and its Poltrona Frau leather upholstery – and the dashboard design was influenced by that of the third-generation SEAT Leon.

Powertrain 
Power is provided in many configurations, throughout either solely internal combustion engines or in a plug in hybrid combination with electric motors.

The power output is delivered to the wheels via a DSG automatic transmission and an electronically controlled all wheel drive powertrain.

References 

20V20
Hybrid electric cars